Omar Jesús Morales Paz (born January 18, 1988 in Tarija) is a Bolivian football defender who currently plays for Wilstermann in the Liga de Fútbol Profesional Boliviano.

International
He was called to play for Bolivia in the 2007 U-20 South American Championship held in Paraguay.

Morales was named in Bolivia's provisional squad for Copa América Centenario but was cut from the final squad.

Club titles

References

External links
CONMEBOL
BDFA Profile

1988 births
Living people
Bolivian footballers
Club Blooming players
C.D. Jorge Wilstermann players
People from Tarija Department
Association football defenders